In algebraic geometry, the trisectrix of Maclaurin is a cubic plane curve notable for its trisectrix property, meaning it can be used to trisect an angle. It can be defined as locus of the point of intersection of two lines, each rotating at a uniform rate about separate points, so that the ratio of the rates of rotation is 1:3 and the lines initially coincide with the line between the two points. A generalization of this construction is called a sectrix of Maclaurin. The curve is named after Colin Maclaurin who investigated the curve in 1742.

Equations
Let two lines rotate about the points  and  so that when the line rotating about  has angle  with the x axis, the rotating about  has angle . By the law of sines, 

so the equation in polar coordinates is (up to translation and rotation)
.
The curve is therefore a member of the Conchoid of de Sluze family.

In Cartesian coordinates the equation of this curve is
.

If the origin is moved to (a, 0) then a derivation similar to that given above shows that the equation of the curve in polar coordinates becomes

making it an example of a limacon with a loop.

The trisection property

Draw a ray from the origin to the point where the first ray intersects the curve.

Notable points and features
The vertical line  is an asymptote. As a nodal cubic, it is of genus zero.

Relationship to other curves
The trisectrix of Maclaurin can be defined from conic sections in three ways. Specifically:
 It is the inverse with respect to the unit circle of the hyperbola
.

 It is cissoid of the circle 
 
and the line  relative to the origin.

 It is the pedal with respect to the origin of the parabola 
.

In addition:
 The inverse with respect to the point  is the Limaçon trisectrix.
 The trisectrix of Maclaurin is related to the Folium of Descartes by affine transformation.

References
 
 
 "Trisectrix of Maclaurin" at MacTutor's Famous Curves Index
 Maclaurin Trisectrix at mathcurve.com
 "Trisectrix of Maclaurin" at Visual Dictionary Of Special Plane Curves

External links

 Loy, Jim "Trisection of an Angle", Part VI

Plane curves